"That's My Kind of Night" is a song written by Dallas Davidson, Chris DeStefano, and Ashley Gorley and recorded by American country music artist Luke Bryan. It was released in August 2013 as the second single from his fourth studio album Crash My Party (2013).

The track has been successful commercially, with "That's My Kind of Night" helping Bryan set a record as the first male country music artist to top the Billboard's Hot Country Songs and Top Country Albums charts simultaneously.

Content and creation
In terms of the song's creation, co-songwriter Ashley Gorley has stated about working with Dallas Davidson and Chris DeStefano that:

The song is an up-tempo track in which the male narrator describes an ideal night with his lover.

Critical reception
The song received mixed to negative reviews from several critics. Billy Dukes of Taste of Country rated the song 2.5 stars out of 5, praising Bryan's performance of the song and describing the production of the song as "corny-cool." He also called it "an eye-roller from start to finish", but stated that "Bryan’s absolute commitment makes it tolerable, if not enjoyable in the right setting." Bob Paxman of Country Weekly gave the song a "C−" grade, saying that "it unfurls all the prerequisite clichés: jacked-up trucks, beer, getting your 'love on', and other assorted triteness", although he also said that it was "undeniably catchy and the record has some nice production touches, including the playful vocal." Ben Foster of Country Universe gave the song a "D−" grade, praising Bryan's vocal performance but added that "Unfortunately, it also has unabashedly dumb, mind-numbing lyrics that insult the history of the country genre and the intelligence of its fans, shamelessly recycling cliché after cliché right from the opening verse..."

In a September 2013 interview, Zac Brown stated that the song was "the worst song [he’s] ever heard." He later clarified on Twitter that he did not dislike Bryan as an artist. In Bryan's defense, artist Jason Aldean posted on Instagram, and one of the song's co-writers, Dallas Davidson, spoke out as well.

Music videos

Tour music video
The tour music video was directed by Michael Monaco and premiered in August 2013.

Official music video
The official music video for "That's My Kinda Night" was premiered on September 13, 2013 on ET Online. It was directed by Shaun Silva.

Commercial performance
"That's My Kind of Night" debuted at number 21 on the Billboard Country Airplay and number 40 on the Hot Country Songs charts dated of August 17, 2013. It also debuted at number 16 on the Billboard Hot 100 and number 19 on the Canadian Hot 100 charts dated of August 31, 2013.

It reached number one on the Hot Country Songs chart in its third week. The single was certified 2× Platinum by the RIAA on May 20, 2014, and it reached its 2 million sales mark in the United States in June 2014. As of August 2015, the song has sold 2,492,000 copies in the US.

Bryan, with the help of "That's My Kind of Night", set a record in late 2013 as the first male country music artist to top Billboard's Hot Country Songs and Top Country Albums charts simultaneously.

Charts and certifications

Weekly charts

Year-end charts

Decade-end charts

Certifications

References

2013 singles
Luke Bryan songs
Songs written by Dallas Davidson
Songs written by Chris DeStefano
Songs written by Ashley Gorley
Capitol Records Nashville singles
2013 songs
Music videos directed by Shaun Silva